The FHP Health Care Classic was a golf tournament on the Champions Tour from 1987 to 1996. It was played in Simi Valley, California at the Wood Ranch Golf Club (1987–1988) and in Ojai, California at the Ojai Valley Inn and Country Club (1989–1996)

The purse for the 1996 tournament was US$800,000, with $120,000 going to the winner. The tournament was founded in 1987 as the GTE Classic.

Winners
FHP Health Care Classic
1996 Walter Morgan
1995 Bruce Devlin

GTE West Classic
1994 Jay Sigel
1993 Al Geiberger
1992 Bruce Crampton
1991 Chi-Chi Rodríguez
1989 Walt Zembriski

GTE Classic
1988 Harold Henning
1987 Bob Charles

Source:

References

Former PGA Tour Champions events
Golf in California
Recurring sporting events established in 1987
Recurring sporting events disestablished in 1996
1987 establishments in California
1996 disestablishments in California